Harry James Souttar (born 22 October 1998) is a professional footballer who plays as a centre-back for Premier League club Leicester City and the  Australia national team.

Born in Scotland, Souttar began his senior career there with Dundee United before moving to England with Stoke City in 2016. He then joined Leicester City in 2023. After initially representing Scotland at youth level, he switched to play for Australia in 2019 and was a member of their squad at the 2022 FIFA World Cup. His brother John Souttar plays for Scotland.

Early life
Souttar grew up in Luthermuir and attended Luthermuir Primary School, and subsequently Mearns Academy in Laurencekirk. He played youth football for Brechin City Boys Club and was attached to Celtic before joining the academy at Dundee United in July 2013. His older brother John is also a professional footballer and plays for Rangers, as well as representing Scotland. Their mother Heather was born in Port Hedland, Western Australia which meant the Souttar brothers were eligible to represent either Australia or Scotland at the international level. They grew up supporting Brechin City where their father, Jack, had played in the 1970s.

Club career

Dundee United
Souttar played for the Dundee United development team, including alongside his brother John in February 2015. Having featured in a number of match day squads and having been listed as a substitute for the first team, Souttar signed a contract extension in December 2015, tying him to Dundee United until May 2018. He made his first team debut against Partick Thistle in a Scottish Premiership match on 10 May 2016 and scored his first senior goal against Kilmarnock four days later.

English Premier League club Stoke City became interested in signing Souttar, and although Dundee United rejected two bids to buy the player during June 2016, it was reported during August 2016 that the clubs had agreed an initial £200,000 fee for his transfer.

Stoke City
Despite an agreement for Souttar's transfer to Stoke City having been reached before the end of the transfer window on 31 August, completion was delayed pending FIFA approval due to the player being under 18 years old. He officially joined Stoke on 29 September 2016, signing a three-year contract for an undisclosed fee. Souttar made his Stoke debut on 23 August 2017 in a 4–0 EFL Cup win over Rochdale. After signing a new contract with Stoke, Souttar joined Scottish Premiership side Ross County on 24 January 2018 until the end of the season. He played 13 times for the Staggies but was unable to help them avoid relegation to the Scottish Championship.

On 30 January 2019 Souttar joined EFL League One side Fleetwood Town on loan for the remainder of the 2018–19 season. Souttar played 11 times for Fleetwood, scoring once against Accrington Stanley. Souttar re-joined Fleetwood on loan for the 2019–20 season. Souttar played regularly under Joey Barton in 2019–20 and his performances earned him the EFL Young Player of the Month award for February 2020. The League One season was ended early due to the COVID-19 pandemic and the table was decided via points per game which saw Fleetwood quality for the EFL League One play-offs in sixth place, where they faced Wycombe Wanderers and lost 6–3 on aggregate.

Souttar made his league debut for Stoke City on 26 September 2020 in a 1–0 win away to Preston North End, and was named as the man of the match. Due to a number of outstanding performances, he was named Stoke City's Player Of The Month in October. Souttar established himself as a key member of Michael O'Neill's side in 2020–21 and he signed a new long term contract with the club in February 2021. He scored his first goal for Stoke in a 2–0 win over Wycombe Wanderers on 6 March 2021. Souttar made 43 appearances in 2020–21 as Stoke finished in 14th position. Souttar began the 2021–22 season in good form having been part of a Stoke defence that had conceded 19 goals in 17 games with the Potters fifth in the Championship before he suffered a season ending anterior cruciate ligament injury whilst playing for Australia in November 2021. Souttar made his return a year later prior to the start of the 2022 FIFA World Cup. After returning to England following the World Cup Souttar attracted bids from Premier League clubs.

Leicester City
On 31 January 2023, Souttar joined Leicester City on a five-and-a-half year contract for an undisclosed fee. The fee was reported by the BBC to be £15 million which could eventually rise to £20 million with add-ons.

International career
Souttar made his debut for the Scotland under-17 team against Romania in February 2015. On 6 March 2019, he was called up to the Australia national under-23 team.

On 10 October 2019, he switched allegiance and debuted for the senior Australian national team at 20 years of age in a World Cup qualifier against Nepal, and scored twice in a 5–0 win; the fourth goal was initially recorded as a Nepalese own goal, but eventually was awarded to Souttar by FIFA. Souttar would go on to score two more goals for Australia in a 7–1 win against Chinese Taipei in his second game for the national team.

Souttar qualified for the Tokyo 2020 Olympics. He was part of the Olyroos Olympic squad. The team beat Argentina in their first group match but were unable to win another match. They were therefore not in medal contention.

He was named in Australia's squad for the 2022 FIFA World Cup in November 2022. Souttar received significant praise for his defensive performances during the tournament.<ref>{{Cite web |date=27 November 2022|title=Give him the keys to the country': Australia loses it over 'Superman' Souttar's epic last-ditch tackle'|url=https://www.foxsports.com.au/football/socceroos/give-him-the-keys-to-the-country-australia-loses-it-over-superman-souttars-epic-lastditch-tackle/news-story/5491cd2d59e19a83d10bb439066190dc |access-date=9 December 2022 |website=FoxSports.com.au |language=en}}</ref>

Career statistics

Club

International

 Australia score listed first, score column indicates score after each Souttar goal.''

See also
List of Australia international soccer players born outside Australia
List of Scottish football families
List of sportspeople who competed for more than one nation

References

External links
Profile at the Leicester City F.C. website

Living people
1998 births
Scottish footballers
Association football defenders
Dundee United F.C. players
Stoke City F.C. players
Ross County F.C. players
Fleetwood Town F.C. players
Leicester City F.C. players
Scottish Professional Football League players
Footballers from Aberdeenshire
Scotland youth international footballers
Scottish people of Australian descent
Australian people of Scottish descent
Australian soccer players
Australia international soccer players
English Football League players
Footballers at the 2020 Summer Olympics
Olympic soccer players of Australia
Australian expatriate sportspeople in England
2022 FIFA World Cup players
Premier League players